Josue Dos Santos or simply Valmir (born 11 April 1979) is a Brazilian football player. He currently plays for Brusque Futebol Clube. Valmir is a central midfielder who plays in the holding midfield role or as an attacking midfielder. Despite often being used in a defensive position, he is mainly an attacking player.

Football career
In Brazil Josue Dos Santos played for Esporte Clube Bahia. Valmir signed with Bulgarian Minyor Pernik together with young compatriot Leandro De Miranda Almeyda in July 2008. He made his debut in Bulgarian A PFG on 9 August 2008 in a match against Lokomotiv Sofia. Valmir played for 90 minutes. The result of the match was a 0:1 loss for Minyor. On 23 August, the midfielder scored his first goal for Minyor against Lokomotiv Mezdra.

Valmir played for Associação Chapecoense de Futebol in the 2007 Campeonato Catarinense.

References

External links
 footmercato profile

1979 births
Living people
Brazilian footballers
Brazilian expatriate footballers
Expatriate footballers in Bulgaria
Association football midfielders
First Professional Football League (Bulgaria) players
Brusque Futebol Clube players
Associação Chapecoense de Futebol players
PFC Minyor Pernik players
Brazilian expatriate sportspeople in Bulgaria